The 2005 Ironman World Championship was a long distance triathlon competition held on October 15, 2005 in Kailua-Kona, Hawaii that was won by Faris Al-Sultan and Natascha Badmann. It was the 29th edition of the Ironman World Championship, which has been held annually in Hawaii since 1978. The championship was organized by the World Triathlon Corporation (WTC).

Championship results

Men

Women

References

External links
Ironman website

Ironman World Championship
Ironman
Sports competitions in Hawaii
2005 in sports in Hawaii
Triathlon competitions in the United States